The Division of Scullin is an Australian Electoral Division in the state of Victoria. It is located in the outer northern suburbs of Melbourne, including Epping, Lalor, Mill Park, South Morang, Thomastown, and Bundoora.

Geography
Since 1984, federal electoral division boundaries in Australia have been determined at redistributions by a redistribution committee appointed by the Australian Electoral Commission. Redistributions occur for the boundaries of divisions in a particular state, and they occur every seven years, or sooner if a state's representation entitlement changes or when divisions of a state are malapportioned.

History

The Division replaced the abolished Division of Darebin at the redistribution of 21 November 1968. It was named after Rt Hon James Scullin, Prime Minister of Australia from 1929 to 1932. The Division has been a safe seat for the Australian Labor Party since its inception. Labor has never won less than 57 percent of the two-party vote, and has generally garnered enough primary votes to win the seat outright, with the exception of the 1990 and 2022 elections.

From 1969 to 2013, the seat was held by two generations of the Jenkins family. Harry Jenkins Sr. was the Speaker of the Australian House of Representatives from 1983 to 1986. His son, Harry Jr. was Deputy Speaker from 1993–1996, second Deputy Speaker from 1996–2007 and was Speaker from 2007 until 2011.

Harry Jr. retired at the 2013 election, and was succeeded by current member Andrew Giles.

Members

Election results

References

External links
 Division of Scullin - Australian Electoral Commission

Electoral divisions of Australia
Constituencies established in 1969
1969 establishments in Australia
City of Whittlesea
Electoral districts and divisions of Greater Melbourne